Moldovenești (formerly Orfalău and Varfalău;) is a commune in Cluj County, Transylvania, Romania, 12 km southwest of Turda, in the valley of the Arieș.

History
The oldest record about the ancient castle at the village is from 1075, calling the place Castrum Turda (the old Turda Castle).  During the Tatar invasions of Hungary in the 13th Century, most of the area around the castle was ravaged.  Later, the land was given to free Székelys who moved here from the Saschiz region and the territory became part of Aranyos Seat.

Bădeni village has been the site of a crematorium since 2014.

Etymology
The commune was renamed Moldoveneşti in the interwar period, in honour of Ioan Micu Moldovan.  The previous name, Varfalău, is derived from Várfalva, which means "village of the castle" in Hungarian.

Component villages

The commune is composed of six villages:

Vălenii de Arieș (formerly Rachișul de Arieș or for short Rachiș; Aranyosrákos; Krebsbach) was a separate village until 1966, when it was absorbed into Moldovenești village.

Population
At the 2011 census, 56.6% of inhabitants were Hungarians, 39.6% Romanians and 3.8% Roma.

Natives
 Ioan Micu Moldovan - historian and theologian, member of the Romanian Academy

Notes

References
 Atlasul localităților județului Cluj (Cluj County Localities Atlas), Suncart Publishing House, Cluj-Napoca,

External links
 Official website of the municipality

Communes in Cluj County
Localities in Transylvania